File Under Rock is a 1988 album by Guyanese-British musician Eddy Grant. The album includes the song "Gimme Hope Jo'anna" which was a hit in Switzerland and New Zealand as well as "Harmless Piece of Fun" which was a minor hit in the Netherlands. The album was titled File Under Rock after years of Eddy Grant being incorrectly described as a reggae artist. In Germany, the album charted for 10 weeks reaching number 48 in 1988. The album was a larger success in New Zealand where it reached number 24 on the charts and charted for 13 weeks. In the Netherlands the album reached number 36, but was only on the charts for 4 weeks. Allmusic's Alex Henderson described the album as being mostly pop rock with slight reggae influences.

Track listing
 "Harmless Piece of Fun" 4:19
 "Don't Talk to Strangers" 4:05
 "Hostile Country" 4:23
 "Win or Lose" 4:20
 "Gimme Hope Jo'anna" 4:04
 "Another Riot" 4:49
 "Say Hello to Fidel" 4:42
 "Chuck (Is the King)" 4:26
 "Long As I'm Wanted By You" 4:35
 "Put a Hold On It" 4:00

Sales and certifications

References

External links
 List of releases on Discogs

1988 albums
Eddy Grant albums